Tricogena is a genus of flies belonging to the family Rhinophoridae.

The species of this genus are found in Europe.

Species:
 Tricogena caucasica (Villeneuve, 1908) 
 Tricogena rubricosa (Meigen, 1824)

References

Rhinophoridae
Taxa named by Camillo Rondani